Basil Hassan is an external operations plotter for Islamic State of Iraq and the Levant (ISIL). In 2013, Hassan was accused of shooting Lars Hedegaard, a 70-year old Danish author and journalist. After being arrested in Turkey in 2014, he was released as part of an alleged exchange for 49 hostages held by the ISIL.   After his release, Hassan was believed to have travelled to Syria to join ISIL. In November 2016, the US State Department issued a note, designating three persons as terror-operatives. He was later revealed as the mastermind of a failed attempt to blow up a long distance plane, in what has now been cited as the most ingenious ISIS terror project.

References 

Islamic State of Iraq and the Levant members
Possibly living people
Year of birth missing